Annual Review of Biomedical Engineering is an academic journal published by Annual Reviews. In publication since 1999, this journal covers the significant developments in the broad field of biomedical engineering with an annual volume of review articles. It is edited by Martin L. Yarmush and Mehmet Toner. As of 2022,  Journal Citation Reports gave the journal has an impact factor of 11.324, ranking it seventh out of 98 journals in the category "Biomedical Engineering". As of 2021, Annual Review of Biomedical Engineering is being published as open access, under the Subscribe to Open model.

History
The Annual Review of Biomedical Engineering was first published in 1999 by the nonprofit publisher Annual Reviews. The inaugural editor was Martin L. Yarmush; Yarmush remained editor until 2021, at which point he was co-editor along with Mehmet Toner. Though it began with a physical edition, it is now only published electronically.

Scope and indexing
The Annual Review of Biomedical Engineering defines its scope as covering significant developments relevant to biomedical engineering. Included subfields are biomechanics; biomaterials; computational genomics; proteomics; healthcare, biochemical, and tissue engineering; biomonitoring; and medical imaging. As of 2022, Journal Citation Reports lists the journal's impact factor as 11.324, ranking it seventh of 98 journal titles in the category "Biomedical Engineering". It is abstracted and indexed in Scopus, Science Citation Index Expanded, MEDLINE, EMBASE, Inspec and Academic Search, among others.

Editorial processes
The Annual Review of Biomedical Engineering is helmed by the editor or the co-editors. The editor is assisted by the editorial committee, which includes associate editors, regular members, and occasionally guest editors. Guest members participate at the invitation of the editor, and serve terms of one year. All other members of the editorial committee are appointed by the Annual Reviews board of directors and serve five-year terms. The editorial committee determines which topics should be included in each volume and solicits reviews from qualified authors. Unsolicited manuscripts are not accepted. Peer review of accepted manuscripts is undertaken by the editorial committee.

Current editorial board
As of 2022, the editorial committee consists of the co-editors and the following members:

 James S. Duncan
 Martha L. Gray
 Todd P. Coleman
 Frances Ligler
 Wendy M. Murray
 Yaakov Nahmias
 Eleftherios Terry Papoutsakis
 Erkin Şeker
 Marjolein C. H. van der Meulen
 Jennifer L. West
 George R. Wodicka

See also
 List of engineering journals and magazines

References 

 

Biomedical engineering journals
Biomedical engineering
Biomedical Engineering
Publications established in 1999
Annual journals
English-language journals